Board of Technical Education may refer to:

India
Board of Technical Education, Delhi
Board of Technical Education, Uttar Pradesh
Maharashtra State Board of Technical Education
State Board of Technical Education, Bihar
Punjab State Board of Technical Education and Industrial Training

Elsewhere
Bangladesh Technical Education Board
National Board for Technical Education, Nigeria